Bayani Agbayani (born January 3, 1969) is a Filipino host, actor, singer, and comedian. After 15 years at ABS-CBN, he shuttled between his original home studio GMA Network and TV5 for the time being from 2008 to 2014 before moving back to ABS-CBN once more. Most of his television shows involves hosting, though he starred in several sitcoms. Most of his films involve actions with comedy. He is a graduate of Mass Communication in Broadcasting at the Polytechnic University of the Philippines.

Early life
Bayani Agbayani was born as Bayani Rogacion, Jr. on January 3, 1969, in Silang, Cavite. He worked as a vendor and porter to support himself in college. Agbayani is a practicing Roman Catholic. And also worked as extra in the television show of the late Apeng Daldal "Cafeteria Aroma" on GMA Network.

Career
Upon graduating from college, Bayani was hired by GMA Network as one of the production staff for the then noontime show Lunch Date. When the show was reformatted to SST: Salo-Salo Together, he was absorbed into the new show and started appearing occasionally as an extra during the show's segment skits. He eventually started appearing on camera (he was introduced by the mononym Bayani) since then as the show's resident sidekick and comic relief, until SST: Salo-Salo Together moved to an earlier time slot to give way to erstwhile rival Eat Bulaga! in the GMA noontime slot. When SST: Salo-Salo Together bade farewell and was replaced by Katok Mga Misis!, he stayed on until 1996. He hired Cornelia "Angge" Lee as his talent manager who subsequently transferred him to ABS-CBN.
 
He later on assumed the screen name Bayani Agbayani when he transferred to ABS-CBN in 1996. Bayani's official debut movie was Wanted Perfect Murder with the comedian Redford White (late) and Eric Quizon and was released in 1997. He also appeared earlier in 1994 in the movie Forever with Mikee Cojuangco and Aga Muhlach but was uncredited.

Bayani ventured appeared mostly in some comedy movies like Pera o Bayong, Mana Mana, Tiba Tiba, Otso-Otso Pamela-Mela-Wan, Walang Iwanan, Peksman, and Sangano't Sanggago; sitcoms such as Super Laff-In, Kaya ni Mister, Kaya ni Misis and Okay, Fine! Whatever!; and noontime shows like Magandang Tanghali Bayan.

Bayani captured the heart of Filipino viewers through his wit and sense of humor.

He returned to his original TV network, GMA Network, with Diz Iz It!, a variety-talent show. He also worked at SRO Cinemaserye, First Time, and his returning sitcom, JejeMom in 2010 with his co-star Eugene Domingo.

In 2012, Agbayani is former mainstay and contract artist of TV5.

In 2015, Bayani returns home to ABS-CBN after 10 years, he's now a new co-host for It's Showtime newest comedy segment, My Funny One, the same year and Bayani is also part of the cast in Pangako Sa 'Yo.

In 2017, Bayani became a SING-vestigator in the Philippine edition of the mystery music game show, I Can See Your Voice. The 5th episode of the first season was his first appearance as a SING-vestigator.

Personal life
He is married to Lenlen and has four children.

Filmography

Television

Films

Discography

References

External links

1969 births
Living people
Polytechnic University of the Philippines alumni
Filipino male comedians
21st-century Filipino male singers
Male actors from Metro Manila
People from Quezon City
Viva Artists Agency
GMA Network personalities
ABS-CBN personalities
TV5 (Philippine TV network) personalities
Filipino male film actors
Filipino television variety show hosts